Cascella is a surname. Notable people with the surname include:

Basilio Cascella (1860–1950), Italian artist
Pietro Cascella (1921–2008), Italian painter
Michele Cascella (1892–1989), Italian artist
Tommaso Cascella (1890–1968), Italian painter

Italian-language surnames